Three Bridges Football Club is a football club based in Three Bridges in Crawley, West Sussex, England. The club is affiliated to the Sussex County Football Association. They were established in 1901 and were founding members of the Sussex County League Division Two in 1952. In the 1981–82 season, they reached the Third Round of the FA Vase.

History

Three Bridges Football Club was founded in 1901. They were founder members of the Sussex County League Division Two in 1952–53, but changed their name to Three Bridges United the following season. In 1953–54, the club were champions of Division Two and gained promotion to Division One. However, they only lasted one season at that level before returning to Division Two. The club's name reverted to Three Bridges in 1964, and in 1968–69, the club was promoted to Division One again, after finishing runners-up.

Three Bridges were relegated again in 1973, but spent only one season in Division Two before returning after another runners-up spot. In 1977, the club was relegated again, this time for three seasons before returning after finishing runners-up for a third time. In the 1981–82 season, they reached the Third Round of the FA Vase. In 1985–86, Three Bridges were runners-up in Division One, and again in 1987–88 and 1988–89. In 1997, the club was relegated again to Division One, but returned two seasons later after a fourth Division Two runners-up place. The club finally secured its first Sussex County League Division One championship in 2011–12 and gained promotion to the Isthmian League Division One South.

Ground

Three Bridges play their home games at Jubilee Walk, Three Bridges Road, Crawley, West Sussex, RH10 1LQ.

Honours
Sussex County League Division One
Champions 2011–12
Runners-up 1985–86, 1987–88, 1988–89
Sussex County League Division Two
Champions 1953–54
Runners-up 1968–69, 1973–74, 1979–80, 1998–99

Cup honours
The Sussex Royal Ulster Rifles Charity Cup
 Winners (3): 1982–83, 1987–88, 2007–08
 Runners Up (1): 2003–04

Records
FA Cup: Third Qualifying Round, 2022-23
FA Vase: Fifth Round, 1981–82
Record attendance: 2,000 vs Horsham, 1948
Most appearances: John Malthouse

References

External links

Southern Combination Football League
Football clubs in West Sussex
Sport in Crawley
Association football clubs established in 1901
Isthmian League
1901 establishments in England
Football clubs in England
Mid-Sussex Football League